A Tuohy (/tOO-ee/) needle is a hollow hypodermic needle, very slightly curved at the end, suitable for inserting epidural catheters.

Epidural needle 

Literally, an epidural needle is simply a needle that is placed into the epidural space.  To provide continuous epidural analgesia or anesthesia, a small hollow catheter may be threaded through the epidural needle into the epidural space, and left there while the needle is removed.  There are multiple types of epidural needles as well as catheters, but in modern practice in developed nations, disposable materials are used to ensure sterility.

Epidural needles are designed with a curved tip to help prevent puncture of the dural membrane. But following accidental dural puncture, headache occurs in up to 85% of patients causing significant perioperative morbidity. However, in case of inadvertent dural perforation, the incidence of headache can be lowered by identifying the epidural space with the needle bevel oriented parallel to the longitudinal dural fibers which limits the size of the subsequent dural tear.

Types
Types of epidural needles include:
 The Crawford Needle
 The Tuohy Needle
 The Hustead Needle
 The Weiss Needle
 The Sprotte Spezial Needle
 Other Epidural Needles : Other less popular types are the Wagner needle (1957), the Cheng needle(1958), the Crawley needle (1968), the Foldes needle (1973), and the Bell needle (1975)—all variants of the Huber design with a blunted tip of varying sharpness.
 Variants like the Brace needle, a Crawford variant; the Lutz epidural needle (1963), with a pencil-point design for single-shot epidural use; the Scott needle (1985), a Tuohy needle with a Luer lock hub; and the Eldor needle (1993), designed for use with combined spinal epidural anesthesia.

History 
Though Ralph L. Huber (1915–2006), a Seattle dentist was the inventor of this needle in 1940, it is known in the name of Edward Boyce Tuohy (1908–1959), a 20th-century U.S anesthesiologist who first popularized it in 1945.

References

Further reading
 
 

Medical equipment
Neurology procedures